= Kenneth Branagh bibliography =

This is a bibliography of the English actor, director, and writer Kenneth Branagh.

== Screenplays ==
- Branagh, Kenneth (1 September 1989). Henry V. London: Chatto & Windus. ISBN 978-0582772687.
- Branagh, Kenneth (15 July 1993). Much Ado About Nothing: Screenplay, Introduction, and Notes on the Making of the Movie. London: Chatto & Windus. ISBN 978-0701160074.
- Branagh, Kenneth (1995). In the Bleak Midwinter. London: Nick Hern Books. ISBN 978-1854592699.
- Branagh, Kenneth (1996). Hamlet: Screenplay, Introduction and Film Diary. London: Nick Hern Books. ISBN 978-0393315059.

== Plays ==
- Branagh, Kenneth (7 March 1988). Public Enemy. London: Faber & Faber. ISBN 978-0571151035.
- Branagh, Kenneth (15 October 2015). The Winter's Tale (NHB Kenneth Branagh Theatre Company ed.). London: Nick Hern Books. ISBN 978-1848425408.
- Branagh, Kenneth (24 May 2016). Romeo & Juliet (NHB Kenneth Branagh Theatre Company ed.). London: Nick Hern Books.

== Non-fiction ==
- Branagh, Kenneth (1 May 1990). Beginning. London: W. W. Norton & Company. ISBN 978-0393331165.
